Sharon White may refer to:
 Sharon White (singer) (born 1955), US country music singer and member of The Whites
 Sharon White (businesswoman) (born 1967), British business woman and former civil servant
 Sharon Finnan-White, Australia netball international